Lawrence Weiss (January 2, 1925 – July 3, 2008), better known by the stage name Larry Harmon and as his alter ego Bozo the Clown, was an American entertainer.

Biography
Harmon was born in Toledo, Ohio and raised in Cleveland. During World War II, he served as a private in the Army. On returning, he wanted to become a doctor, until he met entertainer Al Jolson. According to Harmon's autobiography, The Man Behind the Nose, Jolson told him, "Being a doctor of medicine is honorable, but you'll touch so many more lives as a doctor of laughter!" Harmon instead attended the University of Southern California, where he majored in theater and performed in the Spirit of Troy marching band.

Harmon began making the first of thousands of appearances as Bozo the Clown after attending a casting call in the late 1940s. In 1957, Harmon purchased the licensing rights to the Bozo character from Capitol Records and marketed the property aggressively. By the late 1950s, Harmon had licensed local Bozo TV shows in nearly every major U.S. market, as well as in other countries. He also produced a series of Bozo animated cartoons intended to be shown with the live-action show, performing Bozo's voice himself.

Harmon's animation studio also produced eighteen Popeye The Sailor cartoons in 1960 as part of a larger TV syndication package.

In 1961, Harmon bought the merchandising rights to the likenesses of Laurel and Hardy. Five years later, he promoted a Laurel and Hardy TV cartoon short series called A Laurel and Hardy Cartoon, animated by Hanna-Barbera Productions. Harmon performed Stan Laurel’s voice in that series along with Jim MacGeorge as Hardy. In 1999, Harmon coproduced and codirected a live-action feature, The All New Adventures of Laurel & Hardy in For Love or Mummy, starring Bronson Pinchot as Laurel and Gailard Sartain as Hardy. Intended as the first of a series, it was released direct-to-video and no sequels were made.

In 1984 Harmon stood as a write-in candidate in the presidential election with the aim of encouraging people to vote. Only Arizona reported the number of votes he received, 21. The total number of U.S. write-in votes was 19,315 or 0.02 percent of the vote.

On New Year's Day 1996, Harmon dressed as Bozo for the first time in 10 years, appearing in the Rose Parade in Pasadena, California.

He wrote an autobiography titled The Man Behind the Nose: Assassins, Astronauts, Cannibals, and Other Stupendous Tales, published in 2010 by Igniter Books. One of Harmon's alleged ex-wives disputed the memoir's veracity.

Harmon died of congestive heart failure in his home in Los Angeles, California, on July 3, 2008. He is buried in Mount Sinai Memorial Park Cemetery in Los Angeles.

He was married four times, and had four children: filmmaker Jeff Harmon, and three daughters.

See also 
 Larry Harmon Pictures

References

External links
Bozo.com
The Man Behind The Nose: Assassins, Astronauts, Cannibals, and Other Stupendous Tales
ABC News Investigates Bozo's Origin (2001)
ABC News: Bozo Finally Unmasked (2004)
Associated Press: Who's the First Bozo? (2004)

1925 births
2008 deaths
Television producers from Ohio
American male voice actors
American clowns
USC School of Dramatic Arts alumni
Male actors from Toledo, Ohio
Burials at Mount Sinai Memorial Park Cemetery
United States Army personnel of World War II
United States Army soldiers
Bozo the Clown